K(lysine) acetyltransferase 6A (KAT6A), is an enzyme that, in humans, is encoded by the KAT6A gene. This gene is located on human chromosome 8, band 8p11.21.

Protein function 

The KAT6A protein contains two nuclear localization domains, a C2HC3 zinc finger and an acetyltransferase domain.  This structure suggests that KAT6A functions as a chromatin-bound acetyltransferase. KAT6A is important for the proper development of hematopoietic stem cells.

Arboleda-Tham syndrome

Arboleda-Tham syndrome (ARTHS), also referred to as KAT6A Syndrome (Arboleda-Tham Syndrome), is a rare autosomal dominant developmental disorder, caused by various missense, nonsense, and frameshift mutations in the KAT6A gene. The main characteristics of this syndrome are developmental delay, impaired intellectual development, speech delay, microcephaly, cardiac anomalies, and gastrointestinal complications.

References

Further reading